The rivalry between Ajax and PSV , most commonly known as De Topper is one of the main football rivalries of the Netherlands. It is between Ajax, of Amsterdam and PSV, from Eindhoven and is highly contested. Although not as charged as De Klassieker, the rivalry between the two sides has increased in intensity over the past three decades.

Statistics (since 1928)
{| width=60%
|-
!colspan="10" bgcolor=#B8860B|Matches 
|-
!colspan="2" bgcolor=#ffe5b4|Stage
!bgcolor=#ffe5b4 align="center"|M
!bgcolor=#ffe5b4 align="center"|AJX
!bgcolor=#ffe5b4 align="center"|D
!bgcolor=#ffe5b4 align="center"|PSV
!bgcolor=#ffe5b4 align="center"|GAJX
!bgcolor=#ffe5b4 align="center"|GPSV
|-
!bgcolor=#ffffff align="center"|
|bgcolor=#f5f5dc|Dutch Championship Play-offs (top flight until 1955/1956)
|bgcolor=#f5f5dc align="center"|8
|bgcolor=#f5f5dc align="center"|6
|bgcolor=#f5f5dc align="center"|0
|bgcolor=#f5f5dc align="center"|2
|bgcolor=#f5f5dc align="center"|27
|bgcolor=#f5f5dc align="center"|16
|-
!bgcolor=#ff0000 align="center"|
|bgcolor=#f5f5dc|Dutch Eredivisie (top flight starting 1956/57)
|bgcolor=#f5f5dc align="center"|133
|bgcolor=#f5f5dc align="center"|52
|bgcolor=#f5f5dc align="center"|27
|bgcolor=#f5f5dc align="center"|54
|bgcolor=#f5f5dc align="center"|220
|bgcolor=#f5f5dc align="center"|218
|-
!bgcolor=#ff0000 align="center"|
|bgcolor=#f5f5dc|Dutch Premier League Play-offs
|bgcolor=#f5f5dc align="center"|2
|bgcolor=#f5f5dc align="center"|0
|bgcolor=#f5f5dc align="center"|1
|bgcolor=#f5f5dc align="center"|1
|bgcolor=#f5f5dc align="center"|2
|bgcolor=#f5f5dc align="center"|4
|-
!bgcolor=#ffffff align="center"|
|bgcolor=#f5f5dc|Dutch Cup
|bgcolor=#f5f5dc align="center"|17	
|bgcolor=#f5f5dc align="center"|10	
|bgcolor=#f5f5dc align="center"|3	
|bgcolor=#f5f5dc align="center"|4	
|bgcolor=#f5f5dc align="center"|28	
|bgcolor=#f5f5dc align="center"|20
|-
!bgcolor=#ffffff align="center"|TIE
|bgcolor=#f5f5dc|Dutch Super Cup
|bgcolor=#f5f5dc align="center"|10
|bgcolor=#f5f5dc align="center"|5
|bgcolor=#f5f5dc align="center"|0
|bgcolor=#f5f5dc align="center"|5
|bgcolor=#f5f5dc align="center"|16
|bgcolor=#f5f5dc align="center"|21
|-
!bgcolor=#ffffff align="center"|
|bgcolor=#f5f5dc|Friendly (as part of a tournament)
|bgcolor=#f5f5dc align="center"|3
|bgcolor=#f5f5dc align="center"|2
|bgcolor=#f5f5dc align="center"|0
|bgcolor=#f5f5dc align="center"|1
|bgcolor=#f5f5dc align="center"|6
|bgcolor=#f5f5dc align="center"|6
|-
!bgcolor=#ffffff align="center"|
|bgcolor=#f5f5dc|Friendly
|bgcolor=#f5f5dc align="center"|8
|bgcolor=#f5f5dc align="center"|6
|bgcolor=#f5f5dc align="center"|1
|bgcolor=#f5f5dc align="center"|1
|bgcolor=#f5f5dc align="center"|29
|bgcolor=#f5f5dc align="center"|13
|-
!bgcolor=#ffffff align="center"|
|bgcolor=#f5f5dc|TOTAL
|bgcolor=#f5f5dc align="center"|181
|bgcolor=#f5f5dc align="center"|81
|bgcolor=#f5f5dc align="center"|32
|bgcolor=#f5f5dc align="center"|68
|bgcolor=#f5f5dc align="center"|328
|bgcolor=#f5f5dc align="center"|298
|- bgcolor=#ffe5b4
|colspan="10"|<small>M - matches; D - draws; AJX - victories Ajax; PSV - victories PSV; GAJX - goals Ajax; GPSV - goals PSV; </small>
|- bgcolor=#ffe5b4
|colspan="10"|updated 3 February 2023
|}

Results

Transfers

 From Ajax to PSV 

 Jan Hassink (1925, retired)
 Piet van der Kuil (1959, retired)
 Frits Soetekouw (1967, retired)
 Gerald Vanenburg (1986, retired)
 Ronald Koeman (1986, retired)
 Stanley Menzo (1994, retired)
 Kenneth Perez (2007, retired)
 Nick Viergever (2018)

From PSV to Ajax(r=returning)''

 Gert Bals (1965, retired)
 Peter Hoekstra (1996, retired)
 Kenneth Perez (r, January 2008, retired)
 Ismaïl Aissati (2008)
 André Ooijer (r, 2010, retired)
 Riechedly Bazoer (2012)

(Former) PSVers with an Ajax-past

 Frank Arnesen (retired)
 Jason Čulina (retired)
 Ruud Geels (retired)
 Arie Haan (retired)
 Wim Jonk (retired)
 Florian Jozefzoon
 Wim Kieft (retired)
 Patrick Kluivert (retired)
 Søren Lerby (retired)
 Andy van der Meyde (retired)
 Luciano Narsingh
 Michael Reiziger (retired)
 Marciano Vink (retired)
 Jan Wouters (retired)
 Steven Bergwijn
 Jeremain Lens
 Siem de Jong
 Pablo Rosario
 Donyell Malen

(Former) Ajacieden with a PSV-past 

 Jürgen Colin (retired)
 Dennis Rommedahl (retired)
 Jaap Stam (retired)
 John Veldman (retired)
 Rob Wielaert (retired)
 Klaas-Jan Huntelaar (retired)
 Zakaria Labyad
 Mohamed Ihattaren
 Steven Bergwijn

See also 
 Big Three (Netherlands)
 De Klassieker

References

AFC Ajax
PSV Eindhoven
Football derbies in the Netherlands